Cornukaempferia is a genus of plants in the ginger family. It contains three known species, all endemic to Thailand.

 Cornukaempferia aurantiflora Mood & K.Larsen
 Cornukaempferia larsenii P.Saensouk
 Cornukaempferia longipetiolata Mood & K.Larsen

References

Endemic flora of Thailand
Zingiberoideae
Zingiberaceae genera